Bad Time Zoo is the second studio album by American rapper Sims, a member of Minneapolis indie hip hop collective Doomtree. It was released on Doomtree Records on February 15, 2011. The album is entirely produced by Lazerbeak.

Critical reception
At Metacritic, which assigns a weighted average score out of 100 to reviews from mainstream critics, Bad Time Zoo received an average score of 79% based on 4 reviews, indicating "generally favorable reviews".

The single, "Burn It Down", was listed by KEXP-FM as their "Song of the Day" on June 24, 2011.

Track listing

Charts

References

External links
 
 

2011 albums
Sims (rapper) albums
Doomtree Records albums
Albums produced by Lazerbeak